.bar is an Internet domain that is specifically geared for bars, pubs and nightclubs, including bar and restaurant guides, critics, delivery services, wine and liquor, and related industries. It is a new gTLD owned by Mexico City-based company Punto 2012. The domain .bar was released on June 11, 2014 and its launch was considered to be part of a new phase of the Internet, where domain endings are more defined and better categorised.

Original purpose of .bar domain
According to ICANN, intended use was geographical name for the City of Bar, Montenegro (population at the time 42,000). In order to receive rights, Punto 2012 had to reach agreement with Montenegrin Municipality of Bar for the rights to exclusively exploit domain rights. Still, some organizations and companies from Bar, Montenegro use .bar domain instead of national .me, Some other objects can use this domain name to hack and steal user information.

History 

The .bar launch was divided into three phases: Trademark Holder (Sunrise), Priority Pre-Registration (Landrush) and General Availability. Each phase has specific application requirements.

Trademark Holders Registration (Sunrise) 
From April 9, 2014, at 18:00 UTC to June 8, 2014, at 18:00 UTC, trademark holders could submit an application to register a .bar domain containing their owned mark, before it was available to the public.

Priority Pre-Registration (Landrush) 
From June 11, 2014, at 18:00 UTC to July 10, 2014, at 18:00 UTC, customers could purchase .bar domain names at a premium price.

General Availability 
Beginning July 14, 2014, at 18:00 UTC, customers could register .bar domain names on a first-come, first-served basis. Bulk .bar registration is supported during General Availability. Multiple applications with different registrars are resolved on a first-come, first-served basis during this period.

Other information 
.bar domain names can have up to 63 characters. .bar domains cannot be registered with special characters such as & and # in them.

The .bar extension supports Latin IDN (Internationalized Domain Name) characters.

References

Further reading

External links 

 Official website

Top-level domains
Bars (establishments)